Ivan Todorov may refer to:
 Ivan Todorov (footballer)
 Ivan Todorov (judoka)